The Pennine Coal Measures Group is a lithostratigraphical term referring to the coal-bearing succession of rock strata which occur in the United Kingdom within the Westphalian Stage of the Carboniferous Period. In formal use, the term replaces the Coal Measures Group as applied to the succession of coal-bearing strata within the Pennine Basin which includes all of the coalfields of northern England and the English Midlands. It includes the largely concealed Canonbie Coalfield of southern Scotland and the coalfields of northeast Wales and the minor Anglesey coalfield. The sequence consists in the main of mudstones and siltstones together with numerous sandstones, the more significant ones of which are individually named. Some are laterally extensive, others are more restricted in their range. There are numerous coal seams, again with some being more laterally continuous than others. Those which were economically valuable were named though any individual seam may have attracted different names in different pits and different districts. Marine bands preserving distinctive and dateable marine fossils such as goniatites and brachiopods are widespread within the sequence and enable correlation to be made between sequences in one part of the basin and another and with other basins

Descriptions of the coal seams are found within (or linked from) articles on the individual coalfields. Many of the sandstones give rise to distinct features in the landscape as they are more resistant to weathering and erosion than the intervening shales. Some have been quarried for building material, including flagstones for paving. East of the Pennines, the following main sandstone beds are recorded (note that not all will be present in any one district; multiple entries on one line are of broadly the same age):

 Badsworth Rock
 Houghton Common Rock / Ravenfield Rock
 Brierley Rock / Wickersley Rock
 Newstead (Pontefract) Rock
 'Extra' Rock
 Ackworth Rock
 Mexborough Rock
 Glass Houghton Rock
 Ackton Rock
 Oaks Rock
 Woolley Edge Rock
 Horbury Rock
 Thornhill Rock
 Birstall Rock
 Deep Hard Rock
 Parkgate Rock
 Silkstone Rock
 Penistone Flags
 Grenoside Sandstone
 Wingfield Flags
 Greenmoor Rock
 Elland Flags
 80 Yard Rock / Wharncliffe Rock
 Stanningley Rock / Loxley Edge Rock  
 Crawshaw Sandstone / Soft Bed Flags

To the west of the Pennines, the following are recorded:

 Worsley Delf Rock
 Newton Heath Sandstone / Prestwich Rock
 Nob End Rock
 Peel Hall Rock / Bardsley Rock
 Pemberton Rock / Huncliffe Rock
 Ravenhead Rock
 Chamber Rock
 Blenfire Rock
 Trencherbone Rock
 Cannel Rock
 Tim Bobbin Rock
 China Mine Rock
 Dandy Rock
 Old Lawrence Rock
 Dyneley Knoll Flags
 Crutchman Sandstone / Milnrow Sandstone / 80 Yard Rock
 Darwen Flags
 Helpet Edge Rock
 Inch Rock
 Great Arc Sandstone (Bullion Rock)
 Harrock Hill Grit
 Woodhead Hill Rock / Soft Bed Flags

The term Productive Coal Measures was formerly used for this succession. The Group comprises the:
 Pennine Upper Coal Measures Formation
 Pennine Middle Coal Measures Formation
 Pennine Lower Coal Measures Formation

The Pennine Coal Measures Group is preceded (underlain) by the Millstone Grit Group which is of Namurian age. It is succeeded (overlain) by the Warwickshire Group which comprises a largely non-productive sequence of red beds.

References 

Coal in England
Geology of England
Carboniferous England
Carboniferous System of Europe
Geologic formations of England
Geological groups of the United Kingdom
Geology of the Pennines